David Brindle is a Canadian broadcast journalist and producer.

An anchor for CBC Radio and Television, and CBC Newsworld in the 1980s and 1990s, he was Canada's first television personality to publicly acknowledge that he was HIV-positive.

References

Year of birth missing (living people)
Living people
Canadian talk radio hosts
Canadian television news anchors
People with HIV/AIDS
Place of birth missing (living people)
Canadian LGBT journalists
CBC Television people
20th-century Canadian journalists
21st-century Canadian journalists
Canadian LGBT broadcasters
21st-century Canadian LGBT people